Lovoa swynnertonii, also called brown mahogany or Kilimanjaro mahogany, is a species of plant in the family Meliaceae. It is found in the Democratic Republic of the Congo, Kenya, Mozambique, Tanzania, Uganda, and Zimbabwe. It is threatened by habitat loss. Plantations have been unsuccessful because of infestation by the mahogany shoot borer Hypsipyla.

References

swynnertonii
Endangered plants
Taxonomy articles created by Polbot